The 1990 Major League Baseball  (MLB) Draft was held in June 1990.  The draft placed amateur baseball players onto major league teams. 1,487 players were distributed to 26 teams. The draft consisted of first round selections, supplemental first round selections, compensation picks, and many more rounds, in fact, it went a record 101 rounds with 40 first round selections. With a league-worst record of 65 wins and 97 losses in the 1989 MLB Season, the Atlanta Braves selected shortstop, Chipper Jones out of the Bolles School with the first pick of the draft. Nine NBA and NFL players were drafted in 1990. Seven of the first 10 picks were selected directly out of high school.

First-round selections
The following are the first-round picks in the 1990 Major League Baseball draft.

Supplemental first round selections

Compensation picks

Background
The draft went a record 101 rounds, surpassing 1989's total of 88, and included a record 1,487 selections. The Astros had the most selections with a 100. Seattle followed second with 75. The 1990 draft included two Class A clubs, the Erie Sailors of the New York–Penn League and the Miami Miracle of the Florida State League. Rule 4 draft regulations permitted minor league clubs to participate. Erie made one selection, 24-year-old Brigham Young outfielder Gary Daniels. Miami made 16 selections, signing 15 of them, including All-American outfielder Paul Carey of Stanford in the fourth round. Atlanta made Chipper Jones, a high school shortstop from the Bolles School in Jacksonville, Florida, the draft's top pick. Detroit followed by picking outfielder Tony Clark out of Christian High School in El Cajon, California. The top three picks and seven of the top 10 choices were out of high school.

In the weeks leading up to the draft, the Atlanta Braves, awarded the top selection after finishing with the league's worst record from the year before, had narrowed down their options and were still largely undecided on whom they would take. One name most frequently mentioned was Todd Van Poppel, a right-handed prep pitcher who could scrape triple-digits with his fastball. Van Poppel, however, adamantly stated that he would not sign with the club if they drafted him, and fell to 14th overall due to his massive signing bonus demands. The Braves instead chose a shortstop from Jacksonville's Bolles School named Chipper Jones, who would go on to be not just one of the greatest draft picks of all time, but one of the consensus greatest third basemen and switch-hitters in baseball history. Van Poppel, on the other hand, found very little success in the majors, and professional hitters exploited the lack of movement on his fastball and erratic command. Jones' endearing, easygoing Southern persona and remarkable consistency over his nearly 20-year career (all as a Brave) earned him a first ballot Hall of Fame selection.

Other notable players
 Bob Wickman†, 2nd round, 44th overall by the Chicago White Sox
 Dave Fleming, 3rd round, 79th overall pick by the Seattle Mariners
 Rich Becker, 3rd round, 85th overall pick by the Minnesota Twins
 Paul Carey, 4th round, 100th overall pick by the Miami Miracle
 James Baldwin†, 4th round, 105th overall pick by the Chicago White Sox
 Mike Myers, 4th round, 122nd overall pick by the San Francisco Giants
 Garret Anderson†, 4th round, 125th overall pick by the California Angels
 Ray Durham†, 5th round, 132nd overall pick by the Chicago White Sox
 Bret Boone†, 5th round, 134th overall pick by the Seattle Mariners
 Mike Lansing, 6th round, 155th overall pick by the Miami Miracle
 Mike Hampton†, 6th round, 161st overall pick by the Seattle Mariners
 Troy Percival†, 6th round, 179th overall pick by the California Angels
 Kevin Young, 7th round, 187th overall pick by the Pittsburgh Pirates
 David Bell, 7th round, 190th overall pick by the Cleveland Indians
 Greg Norton, 7th round, 203rd overall pick by the San Francisco Giants, but did not sign
 Fernando Viña†, 9th round, 253rd overall pick by the New York Mets
 Tony Graffanino, 10th round, 264th overall pick by the Atlanta Braves
 Rusty Greer, 10th round, 279th overall pick by the Texas Rangers
 Darren Dreifort, 11th round, 307th overall pick by the New York Mets, but did not sign
 Pat Meares, 12th round, 329th overall pick by the Minnesota Twins
 Brian Shouse, 13th round, 349th overall pick by the Pittsburgh Pirates
 Mike Williams†, 14th round, 374th overall pick by the Philadelphia Phillies
 Rick White, 15th round, 403rd overall pick by the Pittsburgh Pirates
 Ricky Ledée, 16th round, 435th overall pick by the New York Yankees
 Dave Mlicki, 17th round, 460th overall pick by the Cleveland Indians
 Brian Daubach, 17th round, 469th overall puck by the New York Mets
 Marvin Benard, 20th round, 535th overall pick by the Philadelphia Phillies, but did not sign
 Damian Miller†, 20th round, 544th overall pick by the Minnesota Twins
 Eddie Guardado†, 21st round, 570th overall pick by the Minnesota Twins
 Andy Pettitte†, 22nd round, 594th overall pick by the New York Yankees
 Jason Varitek†, 23rd round, 625th overall pick by the Houston Astros, but did not sign
 Jorge Posada†, 24th round, 646th overall pick by the New York Yankees
 Chris Singleton, 30th round, 807th overall pick by the Houston Astros, but did not sign
 Jason Bere†, 36th round, 952nd overall pick by the Chicago White Sox
 Mark Sweeney, 39th round, 1032nd overall pick by the Los Angeles Dodgers, but did not sign
 Rodney Mazion, 48th round, 1222nd overall pick by the Seattle Mariners, but did not sign
 Alan Benes, 49th round, 1251st overall pick by the San Diego Padres, but did not sign
 Rick Helling, 50th round, 1269th overall by the New York Mets, but did not sign
 Al Levine, 53rd round, 1323rd overall pick by the San Diego Padres, but did not sign
 Kelly Wunsch, 54th round, 1327th overall pick by the Atlanta Braves, but did not sign

† All-Star 
‡ Hall of Fame

NFL/NBA players drafted
 Chris Weinke, 2nd round, 62nd overall by the Toronto Blue Jays
 Jeff Brohm, 4th round, 109th overall by the Cleveland Indians
 Scott Burrell, 5th round, 150th overall by the Toronto Blue Jays
 Dino Philyaw, 14th round, 379th overall by the Cleveland Indians
 Mark Fields, 21st round, 565th overall by the Cincinnati Reds, but did not sign
 Kerry Collins, 26th round, 690th overall by the Detroit Tigers, but did not sign
 Greg McMurtry, 27th round, 716th overall by the Detroit Tigers, but did not sign
 Rodney Peete, 28th round, 742nd overall by the Detroit Tigers, but did not sign
 Bimbo Coles, 54th round, 1341st overall by the California Angels, but did not sign

References

External links
 Complete draft list from Baseball-Reference database

Major League Baseball draft
Draft
Major League Baseball draft